Daryl L. Thompson is an American inventor and entrepreneur whose work focuses on pharmaceutical and biological research.  His work has been published and cited in the scientific community, and he has been granted multiple US patents.

Life and career 

Since 2010, Thompson has served as President and Director of Scientific Initiatives at Global Research and Discovery Group (GRDG Sciences, LLC) in Winter Haven, FL, which is a private research and development organization.  GRDG Sciences is a think tank that works to provide solutions to emerging global epidemics and pandemics.

Thompson and GRDG have completed a 5-year comprehensive research project of biodefense applications resulting in a technology portfolio independently valued at $1.39 Billion. GRDG and Thompson engaged in their next 5-year project to expand on this research.

Current projects:

 Linebacker - multi-faceted therapeutic platform for metabolic, neurologic, cancer, and infectious diseases created to mirror the Panacea Project, a US Defense Advanced Research Projects Agency (DARPA) program to provide novel, multi-target therapeutics for unmet physiological needs.
 3F BioFragrance for mosquito avoidance and antimicrobial protection with confirmed in vitro effectiveness against MRSA, E. coli, Tuberculosis and SARS-CoV-2 (COVID-19).  This technology is a surface disinfectant and is also designed to be incorporated into the Open Air Defense Initiative for protection against outbreaks by protecting key points where the potential spread of pathogens occur.
 Sweet Sense Sugar - Sugar modification technology.
 Pandemic Response Strategies and Technology - including Equivir/Nemovir, a patented Over the Counter (OTC) medication successfully tested in vitro against Rhinovirus, Influenza, Cholera, SARS-CoV-2 (COVID-19) and in a Biosafety Level 4 facility, Ebola.  Equivir/Nemovir is both a treatment and a prophylactic for COVID-19 and is moving to human clinical trials.
Quantum - the solution to the Patent Cliff accomplished by creating a new class of medicinal chemistry that uses advanced methods to increase effectiveness and persistence of natural compounds and existing drugs. The safety attributes of the original molecules are maintained.  Typically, drug discovery processes modify functional groups.  Quantum's new techniques alter the behavior of molecules at the sub-molecular level. GRDG estimates that 65% of the World Health Organization Essential Medicines List can be improved and re-patented using Quantum and these methods can be used to enhance and patent natural compounds including many substances used in traditional medicines around the world.
BioQuest TV Series - an engaging science-based adventure series and educational nexus.  The show follows the research team of GRDG as they explore unique locations around the world sharing exciting stories behind their biomedical discoveries focused on solutions to global health issues.  This research is presented in a way that is both educational and entertaining.  The Pilot Episode can be viewed on YouTube.
BioPlastics I - advanced bio-compatible plastics that mitigate accumulation of plastics in oceans and landfills and also provide UVA and UVB protection for many types of material for including containers, hard surfaces, and fibers for clothing.  The technology is presently in development and testing.
BioPlastics II - antimicrobial plastics for consumer products that control the spread of active pathogens such as SARS-CoV-2, Influenza, E. coli, Staph, and Rhinovirus, by exploiting key strategies found in the biological realm. These new plastics are specifically focused on solutions for common products such as cups, plates, utensils, plastic bags, and countertops.  The first prototypes are currently undergoing antimicrobial resistance testing.
Pan-Coronavirus Vaccine - a new method to protect humans against the current COVID-19 pandemic and prevent new outbreaks by future pandemic-causing coronavirus mutations.
CRST1 - Advanced adjuvant for next generation vaccine applications.
Procombin - Binary biochemical enhancement technology to address the emerging antimicrobial and antibiotic resistance issues.

GRDG works outside of government institutions and is exclusively focused on developing medical countermeasures that adhere to the principles and initiatives established by Project Bioshield, BARDA, and the Potomac Institute for Policy Studies.

Thompson is Director of Scientific Initiatives and a member of the Board of Directors of Global BioLife, Inc., a partnership formed to develop and commercialize some of the GRDG technology.  GRDG includes former Assistant Surgeon General of the United States Dr. Roscoe M. Moore, Jr. as Senior Scientific Adviser, and Senior Strategic Advisor former U.S. Army Medical Service Corps Officer LTC (Ret) William H. Lyerly Jr.

Thompson was previously President of ATM Metabolics, LLC which specializes in the development of phyto-chemical pharmaceuticals aimed at preventing and reversing metabolic and neurological diseases.

Thompson was a founder, partner, and served as senior vice president and director of research at Solution Health Systems, Boca Raton, FL, from 2003 to 2006. During that time, his research focused on metabolic issues to solve the global diabetes epidemic.

In 2000, Thompson was recognized for designing a non-invasive glucose meter and received the Diabetes World Humanitarian Award from the Diabetes Research Center.

Published Scientific Studies 

Thompson is co-author of three published scientific studies:

Effect of Emulin on Blood Glucose in Type 2 Diabetics
Myricetin derivatives ameliorate deficits in 6-OHDA animal model of Parkinson's disease
Potential of Flavonoid-Inspired Phytomedicines against COVID-19

Inventions and Patents 

Thompson has successfully developed, patented, and/or marketed:
Method and composition for preventing and treating viral infections, US Patent #10,383,842
Electrophilically enhanced phenolic compounds for treating inflammatory related diseases and disorders, US Patent #10,123,991
 Composition and method for treating diabetes and metabolic disorders, US Patent #8,198,319
 Composition and method for the treatment of neurological disorders, US Patent #8,034,838
 Composition and method for treating diabetes and metabolic disorders, US Patent #7,943,164
 Composition and method for inhibiting reverse transcript of a retrovirus, US Patent #6,319,711
 Levo-monosaccharide in a nucleoside analog for use as an anti-retroviral agent, US Patent #6,090,602
Method and composition for crude formulations of fortified sugar for glycemic control, US Patent Application #15/808117
Low Glycemic Sugar Composition, US Patent Application #15/698159
Electronically Enhanced Phenolic Compounds for Treating Inflammatory Related Diseases and Disorders, US Patent #10,966,954 
Method and Composition for Preventing and Treating Viral Infections, US Patent #11,033,528
Insect Repelling Composition, US Patent #10,966,424
 A non-invasive blood glucose measuring device
 The Grapefruit Solution, a grapefruit-based compound which provides clinically documented weight loss without a change in diet or exercise.
 A natural-based food supplement and pharmaceutical that buffers the sugar in foods and drinks to make foods safer for diabetics and healthier for the population at large.

Books 

The Grapefruit Solution: Lower Your Cholesterol, Lose Weight and Achieve Optimal Health with Nature’s Wonder Fruit (LINX Corp., 2004), with M. Joseph Ahrens

References

External links 
 Global Research & Discovery Group Sciences

Living people
Year of birth missing (living people)